This is a list of all personnel changes that occurred during the 2016 Women's National Basketball League (WNBL) off-season and 2016–17 WNBL season.

Incoming Player Movement

Re-signings

Internal signings

New signings

Outgoing Player Movement

Retirement

Going overseas

Coaching changes

References

2016–17 WNBL season
Women's National Basketball League lists